Nedowein (or Nidowin) is a village in Margibi County, Liberia, near the capital Monrovia's international airport.

A case of Ebola virus disease was diagnosed in Nedowein in late June 2015, leading to a number of people in the village being put under quarantine.

References 

Populated places in Liberia
Margibi County